Mister 44 is a 1916 American silent comedy-drama film directed by Henry Otto and starring Harold Lockwood, May Allison, Lester Cuneo, Yona Landowska, Henry Otto, and Aileen Allen. It is based on 1916 novel of the same name by E.J. Rath. The film was released by Metro Pictures on September 11, 1916.

Plot

Cast
Harold Lockwood as John Stoddard
May Allison as Sadie Hicks
Lester Cuneo as Eagle Eye
Yona Landowska as Larry Livingston
Henry Otto as Dick Westfall
Aileen Allen as Mrs. Westfall
Belle Hutchinson as Mrs. Stoddard
Lee Arms as Ferguson
Franklin Hall

Preservation
A print is prepared and preserved by MGM.

References

External links

1916 comedy-drama films
1910s English-language films
1916 films
American silent feature films
American black-and-white films
Metro Pictures films
Films based on American novels
Films directed by Henry Otto
1910s American films
Silent American comedy-drama films